Drake Stadium was a stadium in Des Moines, Iowa. Originally named Haskins Field, for the son of a primary donor, stadium opened on October 8, 1904 with the University of Iowa winning 17–0 over Drake. The original name of the stadium was Haskins Field, but it was changed to Drake Stadium in 1910 at the request of the Haskins. This is not to be confused with the current Drake Stadium built in 1925. 

In 1907, renovations occurred that added seating, bringing the total to 6,700 and a drainage system was also added. Haskins Field was originally expected to be able to hold 40,000 fans if expanded to its maximum capacity.
Subsequent additions led to a total capacity of 12,000 prior to its closure and demolition.

References

External links
 On Campus: It adds up: Drake Stadium quantified
 Drake football 2010 yearbook

College track and field venues in the United States
Defunct college football venues
Drake Bulldogs football
Sports in Des Moines, Iowa
American football venues in Iowa
Defunct sports venues in Iowa
Sports venues completed in 1904
1904 establishments in Iowa
1925 disestablishments in Iowa
Sports venues demolished in 1925